The FIDE World Fischer Random Chess Championship 2019 (WFRCC) was the first world championship in Fischer random chess officially recognized by the international chess federation FIDE. Previous unofficial championships had been held, with the most recent winner being Magnus Carlsen in 2018. The competition started on April 28, 2019, with the first qualifying tournaments, which took place online and were open to all interested participants; and continued with further rounds up to the quarter-finals, which were also online. The semi-finals and final were played over the board between October 27 to November 2, 2019, in the Henie Onstad Kunstsenter in Bærum in Norway. The winner of the final was Wesley So, defeating Magnus Carlsen 13.5–2.5, to become the first FIDE world champion in Fischer random chess. Over the course of the competition, various time controls were applied, with longer games being weighted more heavily.

Rounds 
The championship included several rounds with different time controls, organizational forms and access requirements.

First qualifying round 
The first qualifying round was open to all interested chess players without a title and was played online via the chess server chess.com. Each of 32 groups played a Swiss-system tournament with 9 rounds and a time control of 10 minutes for the entire game plus an increment of 2 seconds per move. The top 5 players from each group qualified for the second qualifying round, for a total of 160 players.

Second qualifying round 
The second qualifying round was open to the 160 qualifiers from the first qualifying round as well as all FIDE title holders. Each of 12 groups played a Swiss-system tournament with 9 rounds, also with a time control of 10 minutes plus 2 seconds increment. The top 7 players from each group qualified for the third qualifying round, for a total of 84 players.

Third qualifying round 
The 84 qualifiers from the second qualifying round were divided into 6 groups of 14 players each. Each group was supplemented by two invited chess players. Each group of 16 players played a single-elimination tournament. In each round of the tournament, the two players played a “minimatch” consisting of two games with opposite color assignments. In case of a tie, another minimatch with shorter time control was played, and another one with even shorter time control if the tie persisted. If there was still no decisive result after the third minimatch, the pairing was decided by an Armageddon game.

While the first two qualifying rounds brought a number of surprises, the winners of the third qualifying round were all near the top of the FIDE world rankings in standard chess. Nevertheless, some prominent players were knocked out, including Jan-Krzysztof Duda, Sergey Karjakin, Alexander Grischuk and Leinier Domínguez. The following 6 players qualified for the quarterfinals:

Two more players were seeded directly into the quarterfinals: The runner-up in the World Chess Championship 2018 in standard chess, Fabiano Caruana, and the runner-up in the unofficial Fischer Random world championship match 2018, Hikaru Nakamura.

Quarterfinals 
The quarterfinals were played online from October 4 to 6 2019. The first day saw matches between pairs of players. On the second day, the four losers played each other in pairs in a sort of repechage. On the third day, the winners of the first two days played each other in pairs. The three winners qualified for the semifinals: Caruana, Wesley So and Ian Nepomniachtchi. Each match of the quarterfinals consisted of two “slow” rapid games (45 minutes for 40 moves plus 15 minutes for the rest, without increment), two “fast” rapid games (15 minutes plus 2 seconds increment) and 2 blitz games (3 minutes plus 2 seconds increment). FIDE did not explain why the slow rapid games were not called classical when 60 minutes is the minimum for a classical game. The games were weighted differently: 3 points for each slow rapid game, 2 points for each fast rapid game and 1 point for each blitz game. Only one match was tied after the 6 games, the one between Nepomniachtchi and Alireza Firouzja on the first day. Nepomniachtchi won the deciding Armageddon game.

Day 1

Day 2 (repechage)

Day 3 

The matches between Caruana and Nakamura and between Nepomniachtchi and Firouzja ended when a player won by reaching 6½ points. The match between So and Fedoseev was also already decided after the third game with 6½:1½ points in favour of So. Nevertheless, the two players decided to play the remaining three games, even though they were no longer relevant for the qualification for the semifinals.

Semifinals and finals 
The semifinals and the finals took place from October 27 to November 2. In the semifinals, the three qualifiers from the quarterfinals were joined by the world champion in standard chess and the unofficial world champion in Chess960, Magnus Carlsen. The schedule was as follows:

Semifinals 

So won the semifinal match against Nepomniachtchi by reaching a score of 13–5 in the third fast rapid game. Carlsen won the semifinal match against Caruana by reaching a score of 12½-7½ in the last fast rapid game. Thus, So and Carlsen qualified for the final, while Nepomniachtchi and Caruana played for third place.

Finals and third-place match 

The bracket below shows the first-place match between Carlsen and So as well as the third-place match between Nepomniachtchi and Caruana. The matches took place concurrently. So won the championship, defeating Carlsen 13½-2½. Nepomniachtchi beat Caruana 12½-5½ to take third place.

References

External links 
 Official web site of the event

FIDE World Fischer Random Chess Championship
2019 in chess
2019 in Norwegian sport
International sports competitions hosted by Norway
Sport in Bærum
Chess in Norway
November 2019 sports events in Europe
December 2019 sports events in Europe